The 2013–14 Akron Zips men's basketball team represented the University of Akron during the 2013–14 NCAA Division I men's basketball season. The Zips, led by tenth year head coach Keith Dambrot, played their home games at the James A. Rhodes Arena as members of the East Division of the Mid-American Conference. They finished the season 21–13, 12–6 in MAC play to finish in second place in the East Division. They advanced to the semifinals of the MAC tournament where they lost to Western Michigan. They were invited to the CollegeInsider.com Tournament where they lost in the first round to IPFW.

Season

Preseason
Akron announced their complete season schedule on September 2, 2013. On the non-conference schedule, the Zips announced they would compete in the annual Diamond Head Classic in Honolulu, Hawaii. Other key non-conference games included a trip to Saint Mary's during the ESPN Tip-Off Marathon, as well as a road game against South Carolina. For the conference schedule, Akron scheduled home-and-home series with Ball State, Eastern Michigan, Ohio, Miami, Kent State, Bowling Green, and Buffalo. Northern Illinois, Toledo, Western Michigan, and Central Michigan were to be played once each.

Akron opened their preseason with an exhibition victory against Bluffton on November 1. Senior Nick Harney scored 21 points to lead the Zips in a 95–40 rout.

November
The Zips hosted Coastal Carolina on November 8 in their season and home opener. Led by Demetrius Treadwell, who had 13 points and eight rebounds, the Zips held an 11-point lead at halftime and finished off a 72–63 victory, their first of the season. Akron then traveled to Moraga, California to take on traditional mid-major power Saint Mary's as part of the ESPN Hoops Tip-Off Marathon on November 12. The Zips kept it close early behind the play of Treadwell, and despite a strong advantage in rebounding, Akron's poor shooting couldn't lead them to victory, falling 63–85.

On November 16, the Zips traveled to Murfreesboro, Tennessee to take on 2013 NCAA tournament participant Middle Tennessee. After being tied at halftime, Akron stayed with three points until the Blue Raiders pulled ahead by five with 7:10 remaining, eventually winning 80–73. The win extended the Blue Raiders' home winning streak to 32 games.

December
Following a three-week layoff without playing a game, the Zips returned to action on December 6 when they visited Cleveland State. Cleveland State lost the lead eight minutes into the first half, and Akron, led by Nick Harney, who scored 15 points, pulled out a 73–61 victory. One week later, the Zips hosted MEAC foe Bethune-Cookman. Akron held control of the game and never let go, and capped the first half with 37–6 run. Treadwell scored 19 points and shot a perfect 7–7 from the field to lead the team to an 84–56 win, their second straight.

On December 16, the Zips played host to the Golden Eagles of Oral Roberts University. Tied midway in the second half at 52, Reggie McAdams drained two 3-pointers that gave Akron a lead they would not relinquish en route to a 74–64 triumph.

Roster

Schedule and results
Source: 

|-
!colspan=9 style="background:#C29C41; color:#000E41;"| Exhibition

|-
!colspan=9 style="background:#C29C41; color:#000E41;"| Non-conference games

|-
!colspan=9 style="background:#C29C41; color:#000E41;"| Conference games

|-
!colspan=9 style="background:#C29C41; color:#000E41;"| MAC tournament

|-
!colspan=9 style="background:#C29C41; color:#000E41;"| CIT

References

Akron Zips men's basketball seasons
Akron
Akron